Danzigdalen is a valley in Nathorst Land at Spitsbergen, Svalbard. It is located south of Van Mijenfjorden, extending northwards from Svalbreen to Danzigøyra, with a total length of about 11.5 kilometers. At the western side of the valley are the mountains of Lundgrenfjellet and Vengefjellet, and to the east are Fagerstafjella.

References

Valleys of Spitsbergen